Marián Vitko (born February 10, 1994) is a Slovak volleyball player, a member of the hungarian club Vegyész RC Kazincbarcika.

Sporting achievements

Clubs 
Slovakian Championship:
  2014
Hungarian Championship:
  2019

References

External links
 VRCK profile
 Volleybox profile
 SVF profile
 CEV profile

1994 births
Living people
People from Svidník District
Sportspeople from the Prešov Region
Slovak men's volleyball players